Ben or Benjamin Smith may refer to:

Arts and entertainment
Ben Smith (musician) (1905–?), American alto saxophonist and clarinetist
Ben Fox Smith (born 1978), singer of band Serafin
Benjamin Smith (actor) (born 1989), television actor
Benjamin Smith (engraver) (1754–1833), British engraver
Bennie Smith (1933–2006), guitarist
Doc Brown (rapper) (Benjamin Harvey Bailey Smith, born 1977), British entertainer

Media
Ben Smith (journalist) (born 1976), media columnist for The New York Times
Benjamin Eli Smith (1857–1913), editor

Politics
Benjamin Smith (Whig politician) (1783–1860), British politician, MP for Sudbury, 1835–1837, and then Norwich, 1838–1847
Ben Smith (Labour politician) (1879–1964), British politician and government minister
Benjamin Smith (North Carolina politician) (1756–1826), U.S. politician and Governor of North Carolina
Benjamin A. Smith II (1916–1991), U.S. Senator from Massachusetts, 1960–1962
Benjamin H. Smith (1797–1887), American politician in Virginia and West Virginia
Benjamin Smith (Nova Scotia politician) (1786–1873), Canadian farmer, land surveyor and political figure in Nova Scotia
Benjamin Franklin Smith (1865–1944), Canadian produce dealer and political figure in New Brunswick

Sports
Ben Smith (cornerback) (born 1967), former NFL player
Ben Smith (English cricketer) (born 1972), English cricketer
Ben Smith (New Zealand cricketer) (born 1991), New Zealand cricketer
Ben Smith (end) (1911–1941), American football player
Ben Smith (footballer, born 1978), English footballer
Ben Smith (footballer, born 1986), English football goalkeeper
Ben Smith (ice hockey, born 1988), American NHL ice hockey player
Ben Smith (ice hockey coach), Harvard University alumni, US Olympic team coach
Ben Smith (rugby league) (born 1984), Australian rugby league player
Ben Smith (rugby union) (born 1986), New Zealand rugby union player
Ben Smith (squash player) (born 2002), English squash player
Benjamin Leigh Smith (1828–1913), British yachtsman and explorer
Ben Smith (golfer) (1921–2009), American golfer
Ben Smith (CrossFit) (born 1990), American CrossFit competitor

Others
Benjamin F. Smith (1831–1868), Union Brevet Brigadier General, see Siege of Corinth Union order of battle
Benjamin B. Smith (1784–1884), Episcopal presiding bishop
Benjamin Nathaniel Smith (1978–1999), perpetrator of the 1999 Independence Day weekend shootings
Benjamin Smith (priest) (1819–1900), Archdeacon of Maidstone
Benjamin Smith (political scientist) (born 1970), political scientist and academic at the University of Florida
Benjamin Smith (executive) (born 1971), airline executive, CEO of Air France-KLM
Benjamin Smith (slave trader) (1717–1770), early American slave trader, plantation owner, shipowner, merchant banker and politician

See also
Ben Roberts-Smith (born 1978), Australian soldier and recipient of the Victoria Cross for Australia